John "Red" Shea (born August 12, 1965) is an American former mobster from Boston involved in narcotics and an associate of crime kingpin Whitey Bulger and the Winter Hill Gang during the 1980s and 1990s.  He was indicted on cocaine trafficking charges in 1990 and served 12 years in prison.

Shea wrote a book called Rat Bastards; The Story of South Boston's Most Honorable Irish Mobster about his experience with the Winter Hill Gang. His refusal to accept a plea deal to testify against his associates led him to serve the full sentence for his conviction. 
John Shea continued his writing career with the acclaimed young adult novel A Kid From Southie.  The story was inspired by John's life, growing up with an alcoholic father, pursuing the dream of becoming a boxer, living a teenage romance as he navigates a world of organized crime in South Boston as by someone who experienced it.

During a game of football with Wahlberg and actor Alec Baldwin on the set of The Departed, Baldwin accidentally fractured Shea's thumb.

John continues to do national and local commentary for the news media, CNN, FOX and others on Whitey Bulger and additional stories about organized crime.

References

1965 births
Living people
American gangsters of Irish descent
American gangsters
Gangsters from Boston